American Siege is a 2022 American action film written and directed by Edward Drake. It stars Timothy V. Murphy, Bruce Willis, Rob Gough, Johann Urb, Anna Hindman, Johnny Messner, Cullen G. Chambers, and Janet Jones. The film was released by Shout! Studios on January 7, 2022. American Siege was panned by critics.

Premise
A sheriff is put in charge of taking down a gang of thieves who have taken a wealthy doctor hostage.

Cast
 Timothy V. Murphy as Charles Rutledge
 Bruce Willis as Ben Watts
 Rob Gough as Roy Lambert 
 Johann Urb as Toby Baker
 Anna Hindman as Grace Baker
 Johnny Messner as Silas
 Cullen G. Chambers as John Keats
 Janet Jones as Marisa Lewis
 Trevor Gretzky as Kyle Rutledge
 Sarah May Sommers as Brigit Baker

Production
Principal photography for American Siege began on November 10, 2020. Notable filming locations included Fitzgerald, Georgia, Bellingham, Washington, and Victoria, British Columbia. Shot on a $10 million production budget, filming concluded on December 1, 2020. Shout! Studios acquired the North American distribution rights for the film.

Release
The film was released in theaters and on demand by Shout! Studios on January 7, 2022.

Box office
As of August 27, 2022, American Siege grossed $121,967 in the United Arab Emirates, Portugal, Russia, and South Korea, against a budget of $10 million.

Critical reception

Accolades
Bruce Willis was nominated for his performance in this movie, as he was for all movies he appeared in, in 2021, in the category Worst Performance by Bruce Willis in a 2021 Movie at the Golden Raspberry Awards. The category was later rescinded after he announced his retirement due to aphasia.

References

External links
 

2020s English-language films
American action thriller films
Films shot in Georgia (U.S. state)
Films shot in British Columbia
Films set in Oregon
2022 action thriller films
Films directed by Edward John Drake
2022 independent films
2020s American films